John Farmer may refer to:

 John Farmer (composer) (c. 1570–c. 1601), Renaissance composer of madrigals
 John Farmer (author) (1789–1838), American historian and genealogist
John Farmer (cartographer) (1798–1859), Detroit-based mapmaker
 John Farmer (1835–1901) (1835–1901), music teacher at Harrow School
 John Stephen Farmer (1854–1916), lexicographer and spiritualist
 John Bretland Farmer (1865–1944), botanist
 John Hind Farmer (1917–2012), SOE Agent, MI6 Agent
 John Farmer (footballer) (born 1947), English footballer who played for Stoke City
 John Farmer Jr. (born 1957), Attorney General, acting governor of New Jersey, and law school dean
 John Q. Farmer (1823–1904), Minnesota politician and jurist